Robin Walker (born 1975/1976) is an Australian video game designer best known for co-developing Quake Team Fortress, Team Fortress Classic, Team Fortress 2, and Half-Life: Alyx.

Career 

Walker attended RMIT University in Melbourne, Australia.

Together with John Cook and Ian Caughley, Walker started working on Team Fortress as a mod for id Software's QuakeWorld in 1996. Due to the popularity of the product, the team was hired by the then-small Valve to work on Team Fortress Classic and later on Team Fortress 2.

Walker has played development roles in various Valve games, including Half-Life 2 and Dota 2. More recently, Walker has been focused on the collision of economics and game design, in an attempt to transform Team Fortress 2 into a free-to-play, microtransaction-based game. Walker worked  on Valve's flagship virtual reality game, Half-Life: Alyx, released on March 23, 2020.

Influences and philosophy 
Walker has started to use Team Fortress 2 updates to research what additional features are and aren't popular. The results of which he has used for the development of Dota 2, as well as for later Team Fortress 2 updates. Walker also stated that he cannot guarantee that he would keep working on Team Fortress 2 indefinitely and that at some point, he will move on to a new project.

Walker believes in the importance of communication between players and developers of modern PC games, stating that "[b]eing close to your customers – being able to talk directly to your customers – is valuable." In his experience, successful multiplayer games "innovate in gameplay both on release, but also over time post-release, and that those innovations are significant and of interest to customers."

Walker is notably not worried about video game piracy, stating that to fight piracy, he is "looking at the things that pirates are providing and asking [himself] how [he] can provide something better than that." By releasing frequent updates of his games after launch, he constantly improves on his games in a way that pirates could not keep up with. Walker is a supporter of the free-to-play model, as he says that the model supports a wider variety of customers, including those with "very little money," and that such a variety of players results in greater opportunities for richer experiences.

Selected credits

References 

Living people
Valve Corporation people
Video game designers
Video game producers
1976 births